Finnair is the flag carrier and largest airline of Finland, with headquarters in Vantaa on the grounds of Helsinki Airport, its hub. Finnair and its subsidiaries dominate both domestic and international air travel in Finland. Its major shareholder is the government of Finland, which owns 55.9% of its shares (as of 2014). Finnair is a member of the Oneworld airline alliance.

Finnair is the sixth oldest airline in continuous operation and is consistently listed as one of the safest in the world. The company's slogans are Designed for you and The Nordic Way.

History

Founding 
In 1923, consul Bruno Lucander founded Finnair as Aero O/Y (Aero Ltd). The company code, "AY", stands for Aero Osake-yhtiö ("yhtiö" means "company" in Finnish). Lucander had previously run the Finnish operations of the Estonian airline Aeronaut. In mid-1923, he concluded an agreement with Junkers Flugzeugwerke AG to provide aircraft and technical support in exchange for a 50% ownership in the new airline. The charter establishing the company was signed in Helsinki on 12 September 1923, and the company was entered into the trade register on 11 December, 1923. The first flight was on 20 March, 1924, from Helsinki to Tallinn, Estonia, on a Junkers F.13 aircraft equipped with floats. The seaplane service ended in 1936 following the construction of the first aerodromes in Finland.

World War II 
Air raids on Helsinki and other Finnish cities made World War II a difficult period for the airline. Half of the fleet was requisitioned by the Finnish Air Force and it was estimated that, during the Winter War in 1939 and 1940, half of the airline's passengers from other Finnish cities were children being evacuated to Sweden.

Immediate postwar period 
The Finnish government wanted longer routes, so it acquired a majority stake in the company in 1946 and re-established services to Europe in November 1947, initially using the Douglas DC-3. In 1953, the airline began branding itself as Finnair. The Convair 440 twin-engined pressurised airliner was acquired from January 1953, and these faster aircraft were operated on the company's longer routes as far as London.

Jet Age (1960s and 1970s) 

In 1961, Finnair joined the jet age by adding Rolls-Royce Avon-engined Caravelles to its fleet. These were later exchanged with the manufacturer for Pratt & Whitney JT8D-engined Super Caravelles. In 1962, Finnair acquired a 27% controlling interest in a private Finnish airline, Kar-Air. Finnair Oy became the company's official name on 25 June 1968. In 1969, it took possession of its first U.S. made jet, a Douglas DC-8. The first transatlantic service to New York was inaugurated on 15 May 1969. In the 1960s, Finnair's head office was in Helsinki.

Finnair received its first wide-body aircraft in 1975, two DC-10-30 planes. The first of these arrived on 4 February 1975 and entered service on 14 February 1975, flying between Helsinki and New York, later between Helsinki and Las Palmas.

Finnair created Finnaviation was established in 1979. It was formed from the reorganisation of Wihuri OY Finnwings (which had started services in 1950 as Lentohuolto OY) and its merging with Nordair OY. Scheduled domestic services began in October 1979. In the early 1980s Finnair held a 60% shareholding. Finnaviation was eventually completely merged into Finnair.

Expansion (1980s) 

In 1981, Finnair opened routes to Seattle and Los Angeles. Finnair became the first operator to fly non-stop from Western Europe to Japan, operating Helsinki–Tokyo flights with a modified McDonnell Douglas DC-10-30ER in April 1983. Until then, flights had to go via Moscow (Aeroflot, SAS, BA) or Anchorage (most carriers) due to Soviet airspace restrictions, but Finnair circumvented these by flying directly north from Helsinki, over the North Pole and back south through the Bering Strait, avoiding Soviet airspace. However, Finnair did not have to make a roundabout because of the Soviet regulation on this route, but the Japanese authorities demanded it (what JAL requested strongly). The aircraft was fitted with extra fuel tanks, taking 13 hours for the trip. The routes through Soviet airspace and with a stopover in Moscow also took 13 hours, but flights with a stopover in Anchorage took up to 16 hours, giving Finnair a competitive edge. In the spring of 1986, Soviet regulators finally cleared the way for Air France and Japan Airlines to fly nonstop Paris-Tokyo services over Soviet airspace, putting Finnair at a disadvantage.

Finnair launched a Helsinki-Beijing route in 1988, making Finnair the first Western European carrier to fly non-stop between Europe and China. In 1989, Finnair became the launch customer for the McDonnell Douglas MD-11, the first of which was delivered on 7 December 1990. The first revenue service with the MD-11 took place on 20 December 1990, with OH-LGA operating a flight from Helsinki to Tenerife in the Canary Islands.

Subsidiary airlines (1990s–2000s) 

In 1997, the subsidiaries Kar-Air and Finnaviation became wholly owned by Finnair and were integrated into the mainline operations. On 25 September 1997, the company's official name was changed to Finnair Oyj.

In 1999, Finnair joined the Oneworld airline alliance. In 2001, Finnair reused the name "Aero" when establishing Aero Airlines, a subsidiary airline based in Tallinn, Estonia.

In 2003, Finnair acquired ownership of the Swedish low-cost airline, FlyNordic, which operated mainly within Scandinavia. In 2007, Finnair sold all its shares in FlyNordic to Norwegian Air Shuttle. As part of the transaction, Finnair acquired 4.8% of the latter company, becoming its third largest shareholder. Finnair later sold their shares in 2013.

On 8 March 2007, Finnair became the first airline to order the Airbus A350 XWB aircraft, placing an order for 11 Airbus A350 XWB (plus 8 options), with delivery started in 2015.

Labour disputes and restructuring (2006–present) 
Finnair has suffered from many labour disputes in this period, resulting from cost-cutting measures prompted by competition from budget airlines.

On 1 December 2011, Finnair transferred its baggage and apron services to Swissport International as per a five-year agreement signed on 7 November 2011.

As of 2022, it transported about 2.9 million passengers, a substantial decrease from 2019 as COVID-19 pandemic shut down airports and airlines due to travel restrictions. At the end of 2022, the airline employed 5,325 people on average.

Corporate affairs

Ownership and structure 
The group's parent company is Finnair Plc, which is listed on the Nasdaq Helsinki Stock Exchange and domiciled in Helsinki at the registered address Tietotie 9, Vantaa.
The State of Finland is the major shareholder (55.8% as of 2014), with no other shareholder owning more than 5% of shares.

Subsidiaries and associates

Finnair Cargo
Two subsidiary companies, Finnair Cargo Oy and Finnair Cargo Terminal Operations Oy, form Finnair's cargo business. The offices of both companies are at Helsinki Airport. Finnair Cargo uses Finnair's fleet on its cargo operations.

Finnair Cargo has three hubs:
 Helsinki Airport: Helsinki Airport is the main hub of Finnair Cargo. There is a new freight terminal under construction at the airport, scheduled to be opened in the first half of 2017.
 Brussels Airport: Finnair Cargo has used Brussels Airport as a secondary hub for freight operations. Now the cargo airline operates its flights from BRU in co-operation with DHL Aviation (EAT Leipzig).
 London Heathrow Airport: Heathrow Airport is the most recent hub addition to Finnair Cargo's route network. In cooperation with IAG Cargo, Finnair operates to LHR daily with Airbus A350 to carry extra freight.

Nordic Regional Airlines
Nordic Regional Airlines (Norra) is 40% owned by Finnair. The airline uses a fleet of ATR 72-500 aircraft in its own livery, leased from Finnair, and Embraer 190 aircraft, painted in Finnair livery. The airline began operations on 20 October 2011 as a joint venture between Flybe and Finnair. The airline has operated under Finnair's flight code since 1 May 2015.

Business trends 
The key trends for Finnair over recent years are shown below (as year ending 31 December):

Head office 

In 2013, Finnair opened its new head office, known as House of Travel and Transportation (or "HOTT"), on what used to be a car park right next to its previous head office located in Tietotie 11, on the grounds of Helsinki Airport. The construction of HOTT began in July 2011 and finished on time in June 2013. The previous head office had been in use since 1994, then replacing a head office located in Helsinki city centre.

Corporate design

Livery
The company revealed a new livery in December 2010. Major changes include a restyled and larger lettering on the aircraft body, repainting of the engines in white, and a reversal of the color scheme for the tail fin favoring a white background with a blue stylized logo. The outline of the globe was also removed from the tail fin.

Flight attendant uniforms
The current uniform was designed by Ritva-Liisa Pohjalainen and launched in December 2011. Finnair has codes to indicate the rank of crew members: One stripe in the sleeve (or epaulettes in the case of male crew wearing vests) for normal Cabin Crew, two stripes for Senior Cabin Crew (only for outsourced Spanish crew) acting as a Purser, and three stripes for a Purser/Chief Purser. Additionally, some female Pursers have a white vertical stripe on their dresses or blouses indicating their years of service. Finnair requires its cabin crew to wear gloves during take-off and landing for safety reasons. Finnair's previous cabin crew uniform was named the fifth most stylish uniform by the French magazine Bon Voyage.

Partnerships 
Finnair has several partnerships with following companies and airlines including Alaska Airlines, American Airlines, British Airways, Deutsche Bahn (DB), Chinese JD.com, Japan Airlines and Marimekko.

Marketing 
 Finnair had a Weibo account for Chinese customers. Sheng Wei, author of the 2015 thesis "Brand Image of Finnair Among Young Wealthy Chinese People in Chinese Social Media," stated that it was not often updated. In 2017 it began allowing customers to pay with Alipay, another Chinese service.

Destinations 

Finnair flies from its Helsinki hub to over 80 destinations in over 35 countries in Asia, Europe and North America. Finnair also serves six destinations in the United States. Previously the airline has served Africa and South America, including countries such as Egypt, Colombia, and Brazil, but primarily on a leisure basis. Finnair has over 10 domestic destinations. Domestic flights are operated in co-operation with the airline's subsidiary Nordic Regional Airlines.

In 2021, Finnair opened five routes from Stockholm Arlanda to Bangkok and Phuket in Thailand, as well as New York-JFK, Miami and Los Angeles in the United States. Those routes have been discontinued.

On Monday 28 February 2022 Russia closed its airspace as a countermeasure to EU airspace closure. This meant many changes to Finnair’s Asian services, as most of Finnair’s flights between Europe and Asia have used the shortest, fastest, and most environmentally sound route over Russia. On 9 March 2022, flight AY073 departed from Helsinki to Tokyo Narita through the North Pole. Back in 1983, Finnair was the first airline to fly non-stop from Europe to Japan, flying over the North Pole – so operating in the polar region is not new to Finnair. 

Finnair announced a new route to Dallas Fort-Worth International Airport in 2022. Finnair also reintroduced flights to Seattle in 2022.

Codeshare agreements 
Finnair codeshares with the following airlines:

 Aeroflot (currently suspended)
 Air China
 Air France
 Air Serbia
 American Airlines
 Alaska Airlines
 Bangkok Airways
 Belavia (currently suspended)
 Braathens Regional Airways (currently suspended)
 British Airways
 Cathay Pacific
 China Southern Airlines
 Fiji Airways
 Iberia
 Icelandair
 Japan Airlines
 Jetstar Airways
 Jetstar Asia Airways
 Juneyao Airlines
 LATAM Brasil
 LATAM Chile
 Malaysia Airlines
 Qantas
 Qatar Airways
 SriLankan Airlines
 TAP Air Portugal
 Turkish Airlines
 Ukraine International Airlines (currently suspended)
 Vietnam Airlines
 Widerøe

Joint ventures
In addition to the above codeshares, Finnair has joint venture agreements with the following airlines:

 American Airlines
 British Airways
 Iberia
 Japan Airlines
 Juneyao Airlines

Fleet

Current fleet 

, Finnair operates the following registered aircraft:

Aircraft types

Narrow-body aircraft 

Finnair received its first narrow-body aircraft manufactured by Airbus, the Airbus A321, on 28 January 1999. Now the airline operates a fleet of up to 19 A321s. The first Airbus A319 aircraft was delivered to Finnair on 20 September 1999. Since then, Finnair has received 11 A319s, but three of them are now retired. Finnair utilizes Airbus A319, A320, and A321 aircraft on domestic and European flights. The Airbus A321-231, which are equipped with winglets, is also used on some long-haul flights such as to Dubai. ATR 72-500 and Embraer 190 are operated by Nordic Regional Airlines and are also used on domestic and European flights.

Airbus A330 

Finnair received its first Airbus A330-300s on 27 March 2009. Now the airline has eight of them in its fleet. As of April 2019, the airline utilizes A330 on intercontinental flights from Helsinki to Chicago, Chongqing, Delhi, Fukuoka, Miami, Nagoya, Nanjing, New York, Puerto Plata, San Francisco and Xi'an. The A330s are powered by General Electric CF6-80E1 engines. The aircraft are also being used on European services to Brussels, London and Málaga.

Airbus A350 
On 8 March 2007, Finnair firmed up its orders for 11 Airbus A350 aircraft with 8 options. On 3 December 2014, it was announced that Finnair had firmed up the contract for 8 additional Airbus A350 aircraft deliveries starting in 2018. On 13 August 2014, Finnair announced plans to initially deploy its A350 aircraft on services to Bangkok, Beijing and Shanghai from 2015, with A350 services to Hong Kong and Singapore to be added in 2016. As of April 2019, Finnair operates the Airbus A350 to Bangkok, Beijing, Guangzhou, Hong Kong, Ho Chi Minh City, Krabi, Los Angeles, Nagoya, Osaka, Phuket, Puerto Vallarta, Seoul, Shanghai, Singapore and Tokyo. Finnair also operated A350 aircraft on several flights to New York in January 2016 and became the first European airline to operate the A350 to the United States. Finnair sometimes uses the A350 on the morning AY1331 flight from Helsinki to London–Heathrow to carry extra freight as well. Also, AY121/122 operating to New Delhi is also being served by the A350 as of 1 Nov 2022.

Finnair took delivery of its first A350 aircraft on 7 October 2015, becoming the third airline to operate the aircraft, after Qatar Airways and Vietnam Airlines. According to the current delivery schedule, it will receive two A350 aircraft per year in 2019, 2020, and 2021, and one in 2022. Altogether, Finnair will have 19 A350 aircraft in 2022.

Fleet development

Upcoming narrow-body fleet renewal
Due to an aging narrow-body fleet, Finnair plans to retire the Airbus A320 family and replace them with new generation aircraft. The airline estimates to invest up to €4 billion in fleet renewal between 2020 and 2025. Revealed at its Capital Markets Day on November 12, 2019, Finnair plans to grow the size of its fleet from the current 83 (as of November 2019) to approximately 100 by 2025, of which 70% is planned to be narrow-body aircraft and 30% wide-body aircraft. One-third of the total investment sum would be used for growth, while two-thirds would be to replace the current fleet. According to Bloomberg, Finnair will replace the old aircraft with either Airbus A320neo family or Boeing 737 MAX new-generation aircraft. The carrier has also revealed that it is looking for suitable narrow-body aircraft for long-haul use.

On 18 December 2015, Finnair decided to improve the space efficiency of its current Airbus narrow-body fleet due to a growing need for feeder traffic capacity. The value of the investment is approximately EUR 40 million, and it includes 22 narrow-body Airbus aircraft in Finnair's fleet. The cabin layout change excludes five A321 aircraft, which are already configured according to the plan, having 209 seats. The cabin reconfiguration was estimated to take two weeks per aircraft during 2017. The reconfiguration adds 6 to 13 seats depending on the aircraft type, increasing the passenger capacity of Finnair's Airbus narrow-body fleet as measured by available seat kilometers by close to 4 percent. Finnair also planned to increase its narrow-body fleet. As a first step, Finnair leased eight Airbus A321 narrow-body aircraft from BOC Aviation.

Finnair has occasionally suffered from aircraft shortages and therefore has resorted to leased and wet-leased aircraft. For instance, in March 2016, Finnair announced it would lease two Airbus A321 aircraft from Air Berlin for Finnair's European operations. These two aircraft were delivered in late April 2016 to Finnair. The airline used these A321s on flights from Helsinki to Amsterdam, Berlin, Copenhagen, Dubrovnik, Düsseldorf, Ljubljana, Paris, Split, Vienna, and Zürich. On 15 December 2016, Finnair announced it would lease two Airbus A321s from CDB Aviation Lease Finance. The first aircraft was scheduled for delivery to Finnair for the 2017/2018 winter season and the second for the 2018 summer season. Seven of the ordered aircraft were delivered in 2017.

The Finnair-branded short-haul network also includes 24 regional aircraft operated by Nordic Regional Airlines (12 ATR 72 and 12 E-190).

Recent wide-body fleet renewal
Finnair announced the order for 11 Airbus A350 XWB aircraft and 8 options on 8 March 2007. Finnair planned to retire older Airbus A340 aircraft by the end of 2017 and replace them with brand new A350 aircraft. As of 1 February 2017, all Airbus A340 aircraft are withdrawn from the fleet. The very last A340 (OH-LQE) operated its last flight from Tokyo to Helsinki on 1 February 2017. Finnair firmed up orders for eight additional A350 aircraft on 3 December 2014. The first A350 was delivered to Finnair in October 2015 and the airline became the first European operator of the Airbus A350.

As of November 2019, Finnair had 14 A350-900s, with a further 5 to be delivered between 2020 and 2022. The Finnish flag carrier also has considered switching some of the orders for the Airbus A350-900 to the Airbus A350-1000 aircraft but decided to keep the orders for only the A350-900. At the beginning of 2017, Finnair revealed plans to add more seats to some of the Airbus A350 aircraft in order to increase capacity by up to 13%. The new seat configuration has 32 seats in Business Class, 42 seats in Economy Comfort Class, and 262 in Economy Class, a total of 336 seats. This second seat configuration was initially planned to be used on routes with less business class demand such as Bangkok, Beijing, and Seoul, as well as on routes to leisure destinations but they have also been utilized on other busy routes such as Shanghai, Osaka, and Tokyo.

Finnair has modified its previous fleet plan to retire two of Airbus A330 aircraft, which was established in 2014. The 2016 fleet plan now involves keeping its A330 fleet as its A350s are delivered, rather than withdrawing two of them in 2017, and shall retire those aircraft in the 2020s at the earliest. The airline's plan to retire two A330s was not the only change that was planned. Under the previous plan, the long-haul fleet was to grow by one per year, from 15 in 2015 to 20 in 2020. Under the 2016 plan, it was planned to grow to 22 in 2020, and to 26 in 2023. However, should market conditions be weaker than expected, Finnair has the flexibility to return the wide-body fleet to a total of 15 aircraft in 2019 and to maintain it at this level through to 2023. Some of the new A350 aircraft will increase the number of aircraft operated by Finnair.

Special liveries
Finnair's current special liveries are Marimekko "Kivet", Marimekko 50th Anniversary "Unikko”, Oneworld liveries, and the Christmas special “Reindeer” liveries. Past Finnair special liveries include "Marimekko Unikko", "Moomins", "Santa Claus", 1950s retro livery and Angry Birds.

Historical fleet 
Finnair has previously operated the following equipment:

In the early 1980s the fleet of the Finnaviation subsidiary consisted of: an Aero Commander 690, a Beech 95-A55 Baron, Cessna F150J (2), a Cessna 401B, a Cessna F172M, a Cessna 401A, Cessna 404 Titan (2), a Cessna 441 Conquest, a Cessna 402B, a Cessna 425 Corsair, a Cessna F172P, Cessna F152 (2), Embraer EMB 110 Bandeirante (3), a Dassault Falcon 200, a Piper PA-28-140 Cherokee, a Piper PA-32-300 Cherokee Six and a Cessna T188C Husky.

Services

Frequent-flyer programme 

Finnair's frequent-flyer programme is called Finnair Plus. Passengers are awarded points based on the type and class of flight flown. Once enough kilometers are banked into the passenger's account, a membership tier (Basic, Silver, Gold, Platinum or Platinum Lumo) is awarded. There is a Junior tier exclusively for minors. Silver, Gold, Platinum, and Platinum Lumo members have privileges such as premium check-in desks and priority boarding.

Finnair offers frequent-flyer partnerships with Nordic Regional Airlines (only for the 2000 flight number series, not for domestic flights) in addition to those in the Oneworld alliance:

In addition to earning points on flights with Finnair and its partner airlines, Finnair Plus members can earn points through various hotel and car rental partners in Finland and around the world along with other service partners.

Cabins

Business class
Business class is offered on the entire Airbus-fleet. On long-haul aircraft, the seats are equipped with personal in-flight entertainment. Zodiac Cirrus III seats are fitted in Business Class on all wide-body aircraft. Each seat has direct aisle access and reclines to a 78-inch full flat bed. In February 2022, Finnair unveiled new long-haul business class seats, alongside the debut of a premium economy cabin. The seats are based on the Collins Aerospace's Aerospace AirLounge. The seats are enclosed in a shell with no recline capabilities. According to the airline, this allows passengers to choose a wide variety of sitting and sleeping positions.

Premium Economy class
Premium economy is new Finnair's new premium economy debuting in February 2022 that currently rolled out on the Airbus A330s and A350s. The seats are based on the Vector Premium by HAECO.

Economy Comfort class
Economy Comfort is Finnair's new premium economy product debuting on long haul aircraft in December 2014. It will not be a separate class but more of an upgraded economy product, much like Delta's Comfort+ class. Economy Comfort seats will be located in the first 5 rows of economy providing 34–36" of pitch (3–5" more pitch than standard economy seats) and a comfier headrest, plus noise canceling headphones and a comfort kit. Seats will be free to Finnair Plus and oneworld elites and passengers with a full fare coach ticket, and available to all other customers for a fee.

Economy class

Finnair lounges 

Finnair operates three of its own lounges at Helsinki Airport. One is accessible in the Schengen Area by travelers in Finnair's Business Class, Gold and Platinum of the Finnair Plus program members as well as Oneworld Sapphire and Emerald members. The two others are located in the non-Schengen area and the Finnair Business Lounge has the same access criteria as the one in the Schengen area except Japan Airlines Business Class passengers also have access. In June 2019, the new Finnair Platinum Wing lounge was opened in the non-Schengen area. Replacing the previous Premium Lounge, this lounge is exclusively for Finnair Plus Platinum and OneWorld Emerald passengers. Passengers in business class, as well as Finnair Plus Gold members and OneWorld Sapphire passengers are able to use the Business Class Lounge. The non-Schengen lounges have a Finnish sauna. The remaining international destinations are served with contract lounges.

Meals and drinks 
On most European flights, only blueberry juice is free. Other beverages, including alcoholic ones, and food items are available for purchase. Domestic flights as well as shorter European flights have snacks for sale and free non-alcoholic beverages. Business class offers warm meals and free beverages, including alcohol. On most Intercontinental flights there is a choice of meals in economy class. In inter-continental business class on most Airbus aircraft (excluding those with fully lie-flat seats), there is a dedicated snack bar. As of November 2014 the complimentary salad or sandwich is discontinued, and free beverages have been limited to coffee, tea, water, milk and blueberry juice on European flights.

In-flight entertainment 
All Finnair aircraft have LCD video monitors or personal entertainment systems except the Embraer 170s and 190s and the Airbus A321-231 (Sharklet). Airbus A320 series aircraft have monitors showing exterior shots, moving-map systems and mute television programs. Airbus A330 and Airbus A350 aircraft have an AVOD personal entertainment system on all seats with about 72 movies, 150 TV shows, 200 music albums, 24 radio channels, and 15 games.

In-flight magazine
Finnair's English-language in-flight magazine, Blue Wings, is published 10 times a year by the Finnish media group Sanoma. The first edition of Blue Wings magazine was published in 1980. There are domestic and international newspapers on all flights and magazines on long-haul flights in business class.

Environmental issues 
In December 2018, Finnair flights out of SFO began being supplied with sustainable aviation fuel as part of a project involving SFO, Shell, and SkyNRG.

Incidents and accidents 

On 16 November 1927, a Junkers F.13 disappeared in a route from Tallinn to Helsinki. The pilot and his two passengers were never found.
On 10 November 1937, a Junkers Ju 52 in a route from Turku to Stockholm suffered the detachment of the nose-engine whilst over the sea. The pilots managed to successfully land the aircraft with no fatalities. A broken propeller blade resulted in a severe imbalance that tore the engine off.
On 14 June 1940, Ju 52 aircraft Kaleva operating as Flight 1631, was shot down by the Soviet Air Force over the Gulf of Finland, apparently as a prelude to the Occupation of Estonia. All 9 people on board perished.
On 7 June 1941, a Ju 52 aircraft equipped with floats was forced to make an emergency landing after losing power on all three engines due to fuel impurity. Although the aircraft was recovered and returned to service, the two occupants of the aircraft drowned while attempting to swim to safety.
On 31 October 1945, a Ju 52 suffered a CFIT on approach to Hyvinkää. Radio signals were distorted by high-tension wires and the pilots let the plane descend too low. All 14 people on board survived, but the aircraft was written off.
On 3 January 1961, Flight 311 from Kronoby to Vaasa flown by a Douglas DC-3 stalled on final approach and crashed, killing all 25 people on board. The two pilots were both intoxicated by alcohol and sleep deprived. This is Finland's worst aviation accident.
On 8 November 1963, Flight 217 from Helsinki to Mariehamn via Turku flown by a DC-3 crashed into terrain on final approach to Mariehamn. The sole flight attendant and two passengers were the only survivors of the crash. The cause was believed to have been poor visibility and a malfunctioning altimeter that tricked the pilots into believing they were higher than they really were. 20 passengers and 2 crew were killed. To date, this is Finnair's last fatal accident.
On 30 September 1978, Flight 405 from Oulu to Helsinki flown by Sud Aviation Caravelle was hijacked by Aarno Lamminparras armed with a pistol (Finland did not perform security checks on domestic flights), who held the 48 other passengers and crew hostage. The plane continued to Helsinki, where 34 of the 44 passengers were released before returning to Oulu where the hijacker received a large ransom from Finnair. The plane then returned to Helsinki for another ransom from a Finnish newspaper before flying to Amsterdam and then back to Helsinki before returning to Oulu. The hijacker released the last hostages and departed the plane before being arrested on October 1 at his home.
On 23 December 1987, Flight 915 from Tokyo to Helsinki was allegedly shot at by a missile whilst over Svalbard. The missile allegedly exploded in the air before striking the DC-10. The events were not revealed until 2014.

References

Sources

External links 

 
 Finnair Group official website
 Route Map
 Finnair Facebook page
 Finnair YouTube Channel
 History of Oy Aero Ab

 
Airlines of Finland
Airlines established in 1923
Association of European Airlines members
Companies listed on Nasdaq Helsinki
Government-owned airlines
Partly privatized companies of Finland
Finnish brands
1923 establishments in Finland